World Trivia Night is North America's largest live trivia contest, held annually in Ottawa, Ontario since 1993. (In this sense, "live" means people answering the same questions, read live in the same forum, as opposed to radio contests.) Originally organized by the Kiwanis Club of Orleans (Ottawa), the event is now organized by the Children's Aid Foundation of Ottawa, which uses it to fund educational and life enrichment opportunities for children and youth who are supported by The Children's Aid Society of Ottawa. Each year, 1,500 people play in teams of up to 10 people. The event was originally held at the Aberdeen Pavilion before moving to the EY Centre in 2012. The questions are prepared by Paul Paquet of triviahalloffame.com and the Ottawa Trivia League. Many political and media luminaries attend. Former mayor Jacquelin Holzman once served as a judge, and in 2003, Ken Jennings read the first question via videotape. By tradition, the first answer is always Pierre Trudeau, as a tip of the hat to the long-running radio trivia contest in Stevens Point, which always begins with a question about Robert Redford. Since 2006, the winners have been awarded the Trong Nguyen Memorial Trophy, named after a member of wirecrats.com who died earlier that year. The first place winners also win $5,000 cash if they are a champion team.

World Trivia Night 2020 and 2021 were held online due to the pandemic, but returned to an in-person event in 2022.

Winning teams

 1995: The Data Banks
 1996: The Bank Dicks
 1997: Puzzles
 1998: The Viagrins (later renamed the Smarts)
 1999: Puzzles
 2000: Random Access Memory
 2001: La Triviata
 2002: La Triviata
 2003: Me and Nine Idiots (after a scoring adjustment, La Triviata shared the title)
 2004: Wirecrats.com
 2005: Shocked and Appalled 
 2006: Fran Mahovlich
 2007: Shocked and Appalled
 2008: La Triviata
 2009: I Lost on Jeopardy 
 2010: Wirecrats.com
 2011: Nerd Alert
 2012: The Sticky Buns
 2013: La Triviata
 2014: Nerd Alert (although Mizar Flying Pintos was the top "champion" team)
 2015: La Triviata
 2016: I Lost on Jeopardy
 2017: The Sticky Buns
 2018: The Sticky Buns
 2019: La Triviata
 2020: La Triviata
 2021: La Triviata

External links
Official website

Trivia competitions